San Esteban, officially the Municipality of San Esteban, is a 5th class municipality in the province of Ilocos Sur, Philippines. According to the 2020 census, it has a population of 8,381 people.

Etymology
The Spaniards named the pueblo (the equivalent of a municipality in present-day terms) San Esteban (formerly known as Cabagbagototan) because they have received reports of a vagabond named Iban having been stoned to death and beheaded by hostile natives in the place called "Naglawlawayan," which is an early place of worship by the natives, and currently the site of the municipal cemetery.  "Iban" is the Ilocano equivalent of "Stephen," hence the pueblo being named San Esteban.

San Esteban was founded by Augustinian friars in 1625, but was always attached to Nueva Coveta (present-day Burgos) and to the municipality of Santiago until 1911.  It was once a visita of Narvacan because of a shortage of ministers.

Geography

Barangays
San Esteban is politically subdivided into 10 barangays. These barangays are headed by elected officials: Barangay Captain, Barangay Council, whose members are called Barangay Councilors. All are elected every three years.

Ansad
Apatot
Bateria
Cabaroan
Cappa-Cappa
Poblacion
San Nicolas
San Pablo
San Rafael
Villa Quirino

Climate

Demographics

In the 2020 census, San Esteban had a population of 8,381.

Economy

Government
San Estaban, belonging to the second congressional district of the province of Ilocos Sur, is governed by a mayor designated as its local chief executive and by a municipal council as its legislative body in accordance with the Local Government Code. The mayor, vice mayor, and the councilors are elected directly by the people through an election which is being held every three years.

Elected officials

References

External links
 
Pasyalang Ilocos Sur
San Esteban website
Philippine Standard Geographic Code
Philippine Census Information
Local Governance Performance Management System

Municipalities of Ilocos Sur